Otis Floyd (born June 13, 1976) is a former gridiron football linebacker. He most recently played for the Hamilton Tiger-Cats of the Canadian Football League.

College years
Floyd played five seasons for the University of Louisville.

Professional career
Floyd won a Grey Cup championship in 2001 with the Calgary Stampeders, and then in 2006 with the BC Lions.

References

External links
Hamilton Tiger-Cats bio

Personal life 
Floyd owns a roofing company called Paramount Roofing & Consulting, Inc in Douglasville, GA

Living people
American football linebackers
American players of Canadian football
BC Lions players
Calgary Stampeders players
Canadian football linebackers
Louisville Cardinals football players
Players of American football from Detroit
San Francisco Demons players
1976 births